Crinkle may refer to:

 Crinkle Crags, a fell in the English Lake District
 Crinkle-cutting, a cutting technique in cooking
 Chocolate crinkle, a kind of chocolate-flavored cookie covered in white powdered sugar.

See also
 Crinkill